The 1922 Alabama gubernatorial election took place on November 7, 1922, in order to elect the governor of Alabama. Democratic incumbent Thomas Kilby was term-limited, and could not seek a second consecutive term.

Democratic primary
At the time this election took place, Alabama, as with most other Southern states, was solidly Democratic, and the Republican Party had such diminished influence that the Democratic primary was the de facto contest for state offices; after winning the Democratic primary it was a given the parties candidate would win the general election.

Results

Results

References

1922
gubernatorial
Alabama
November 1922 events